Nikolai Ottonovich von Rozenbakh (Николай Оттонович фон Розенбах) (12 June 1836 in Püssi – 5 May 1901 in Petersburg) was a Russian General during the nineteenth century.

He was Governor-General of the Guberniya of Russian Turkestan and commander of the Turkestan Military District from 1884 to 1889.

In 1884, Regel in 'Trudy Imperatorskago St. Peterburgskago Botaniceskago Sada' Vol.3, published Iris rosenbachiana, it was found in Turkestan and named after Rozenbakh.

References

Russian military leaders
Politicians of the Russian Empire
Russian people of the January Uprising
1889 deaths
1804 births